Gyöngyi Drávai (born 2 January 1990, in Budapest) is a retired Hungarian handballer.

She joined Békéscsaba on loan from Győri ETO KC in July 2010 with an option to buy the player at the end of the season. Békéscsaba used the option and Drávai signed permanently to the Purples in June 2011.

Achievements
Nemzeti Bajnokság I:
Winner: 2007, 2008
Magyar Kupa:
Winner: 2007, 2008
Silver Medalist: 2012
Slovakian Championship:
Silver Medalist: 2009
Slovakian Cup:
Winner: 2009
Junior European Championship:
Silver Medalist: 2009

References

External links
 Gyöngyi Drávai career statistics at Worldhandball 

1990 births
Living people
Handball players from Budapest
Hungarian female handball players
Győri Audi ETO KC players
Békéscsabai Előre NKSE players
Expatriate handball players
Hungarian expatriate sportspeople in Slovakia